Camille Wagner (13 April 1925 – 7 February 2014) was a Luxembourgian footballer. He competed in the men's tournament at the 1952 Summer Olympics.

References

External links
 

1925 births
2014 deaths
Luxembourgian footballers
Luxembourg international footballers
Olympic footballers of Luxembourg
Footballers at the 1952 Summer Olympics
People from Schifflange
Association football defenders